Arctic Dogs (also known as Arctic Justice internationally or Polar Squad in the UK) is a 2019 computer-animated comedy film co-written and directed by Aaron Woodley and co-directed by Dimos Vrysellas. The film stars the voices of Jeremy Renner, Heidi Klum, James Franco, John Cleese, Omar Sy, Michael Madsen, Laurie Holden, Anjelica Huston, and Alec Baldwin. Entertainment Studios released the film on November 1 in Canada and the United States. It was a box-office bomb, grossing less than a fifth of its production budget of $50 million, and was panned by critics.

Plot
Swifty (Jeremy Renner), an Arctic fox, works in the mailroom of the Arctic Blast Delivery Service, but he has much bigger dreams. He wishes to become a Top Dog, the Arctic's star husky couriers. To prove he can do it, he commandeers one of the sleds and delivers a mysterious package to a secret location. Once there, he stumbles onto a hidden fortress, overseen by the nefarious Otto Von Walrus (John Cleese). The blubbery evil genius commands an army of oddly polite puffin henchmen. Swifty discovers Otto Von Walrus' villainous plan to drill beneath the snow-packed surface to unleash masses of ancient gas to melt the Arctic and become the world's supreme ruler. To stop this sinister scheme, Swifty enlists the help of his friends: P.B.(Alec Baldwin), a neurotic polar bear, Lemmy (James Franco), a scatterbrained albatross, Jade (Heidi Klum), a brainy red fox engineer and Swifty's love interest, Leopold (Omar Sy) and Bertha (also voiced by Heidi Klum), two conspiracy theorist otters, and Magda (Anjelica Huston), his curmudgeonly caribou boss.

Voice cast
 Jeremy Renner as Swifty, an Arctic fox
Anderson Lewis as Young Swifty
 Alec Baldwin as P.B., a polar bear
 Heidi Klum as Jade, a red fox, and Bertha, an Eurasian otter
Lillian Moloy as Young Jade
 John Cleese as Doc Otto Van Walrus, a walrus
 Anjelica Huston as Magda, a caribou
 James Franco as Lemmy, an albatross
 Omar Sy as Leopold, an Eurasian otter
 Michael Madsen as Duke, a Siberian Husky
 Laurie Holden as Dakota, a Siberian Husky
 Donny Falsetti as Dusty, a Siberian Husky
 Nina Senicar as Countdown Inka
 Aaron Woodley as Puffin Leader, a horned puffin
 Soraya Azzabi as Alma
 Jason Deline as "Nasty Naz" Narwhal, a narwhal

Release
Arctic Dogs was released on November 1, 2019, in both Canada and the United States. Lionsgate Home Entertainment released it on DVD and Blu-ray on February 4, 2020. It made $1.3 million in total US video sales.

Reception

Box office
In the United States and Canada, Arctic Dogs was released alongside Harriet, Terminator: Dark Fate, and Motherless Brooklyn, and was projected to gross $5–10 million from 2,835 theaters in its opening weekend. It made $700,000 on its first day, and ended up debuting to just $2.9 million, finishing 10th and marking the worst opening of all-time for a film playing in over 2,800 theaters.

Critical response
Metacritic assigned the film a weighted average score of 28 out of 100 based on four critics, indicating "generally unfavorable reviews." Audiences polled by CinemaScore gave the film an average grade of "B−" on an A+ to F scale, while those surveyed at PostTrak gave it an overall positive score of 64% and a 41% "definite recommend".

In 2020, it received a Canadian Cinema Editors Awards nomination for Best Editing in Animation.

Other media
A web series set after the events of the film titled Arctic Friends was released on September 15, 2020 on both Apple TV+ and Amazon Prime Video, consisting of 40 collections (160 shorts). Another spin-off series titled Puffins was also released, featuring the voice of Johnny Depp as Johnny Puff. A spin-off of Puffins, entitled Puffins Impossible, is slated for release and is to consist of 16 five-minute episodes with Depp to reprise his role as Puff.
Αlso released two Christmas live action/animation spin off films titled Christmas Thieves (2021) and The Good Witch of Christmas (2022).

References

External links

2019 films
2019 computer-animated films
American computer-animated films
Canadian animated feature films
Canadian computer-animated films
Italian animated films
Films set in the Arctic
Animated films about foxes
Animated films about dogs
Animated films about birds
Films about otters
Films about polar bears
Films about conspiracy theories
Films adapted into television shows
Films scored by David Buckley
Assemblage Entertainment
Lionsgate animated films
Entertainment Studios films
2010s English-language films
2010s American films
2010s Canadian films
2010s Italian films